The Corrs Unplugged is a live album by Irish band the Corrs, released in 1999. The album is part of MTV's Unplugged series. It was released internationally but for a short time was not available in the United States until later. The song "No Frontiers" was sung by Sharon and Caroline, with Jim playing the piano. It is a cover of the Mary Black song, written by Jimmy MacCarthy.

The CD release features the songs in a somewhat different order to in which they were actually performed. Dreams was omitted from the track list and is only featured as a bonus track on some releases. The DVD and VHS retains the original song order and are also mostly unedited, while the CD edits out almost all of the talking between songs.

Track listing

CD

DVD and VHS track listing
 "Only When I Sleep"
 "What Can I Do"
 "Radio"
 "Toss The Feathers"
 "Everybody Hurts"
 "Dreams"
 "Runaway"
 "Forgiven Not Forgotten"
 "At Your Side"
 "Little Wing"
 "No Frontiers"
 "Queen Of Hollywood"
 "Old Town (This Boy Is Cracking Up)"
 "(Lough) Erin Shore"
 "So Young"

Personnel

The Corrs 
 Andrea Corr – lead vocals, tin whistle
 Caroline Corr – drums, tambourine, bodhrán, conga, piano, backing vocals, co-lead vocals on "No Frontiers"
 Sharon Corr – violin, backing vocals, co-lead vocals on "No Frontiers"
 Jim Corr – acoustic guitar, piano, backing vocals

Guest musicians 
 Anthony Drennan – acoustic guitar, dobro
 Keith Duffy – bass guitar, percussion
 Mitchell Froom – Hammond organ, piano
 The Irish Film Orchestra conducted by Fiachra Trench – orchestration

Technical 
 Engineers – Tim Martin and Tim Summerhayes
 Producers – Mitchell Froom and the Corrs

Charts

Album charts

Video charts

Year-end charts

All-time charts

Certifications

Album certifications

Video certifications

Release history 
 , Belgium, Ireland, Sweden, Atlantic 7567-80986-2, CD
 , Europe, Canada, UK, Atlantic 7567-80986-2, CD
 , Singapore, Atlantic 7567-80986-2/4, CD (with bonus track)
 , Australia, Atlantic 7567-80992-2, CD (with "Dreams" bonus track)
 , Japan, Warner AMCY-7120, CD (with "Dreams" bonus track)
 , Mexico, Atlantic CS 809862–8, CD (with "Dreams" bonus track)
 , Germany, Atlantic 0756-792890-2, CD (reissue, with different bonus track)
 , Taiwan, Warner 7567-80986-2, CD (with bonus disk of "Rainy Day" 7567-80986-4)
 , Australia, Warner 7567-93277-2, CD (double album with The Best of The Corrs)

References 

Unplugged (Corrs, The album)
The Corrs albums
Albums produced by Mitchell Froom
1999 live albums
Live video albums
1999 video albums
143 Records live albums
143 Records video albums
Atlantic Records live albums
Atlantic Records video albums